Brunki  is a village in the administrative district of Gmina Barlinek, within Myślibórz County, West Pomeranian Voivodeship, in north-western Poland.

The village has a population of 70.

See also
 History of Pomerania

References

Brunki